The El Salvador national rugby league team (Spanish: rugby league equipo nacional de El Salvador), nicknamed El Trueno Azul (English: Blue Thunder), represents El Salvador in rugby league. They had their first international 9's tournament in 2015 in Australia along with Chile in Latin America at the Cabramatta International Nines.

History

Rugby league Has yet to be played on El Salvador soil but efforts are in place to bring rugby league to Central and South America through the Latin Heat Rugby League. In the very first full Latino team 4 Salvadorans were included. After the Latin Heat fielded enough Salvadoran players to make up a Rugby league nines team they entered into the Cabramatta International Nines tournament in 2015.

On 17 October 2015 The El Salvador national rugby league team debuted in the Latino Rugby League Sevens Tournament on 17 October 2015. They finished 1-1.

The El Salvador national rugby league team entered the 2016 Cabramatta International Nines on 30 January with a 15-man squad. Their pool consisted of Ireland, DV Koori and Malta.

On June 11, 2016 The Trueno Azul made their full 13-a-side debut playing latino rivals Chile at Henson Park, Sydney. El Salvador lost 58-20.

Current squad
The El Salvador national team selected for the 2016 Cabramatta International Nines tournament were:

Record

Below is table of the representative rugby league nines matches played by El Salvador up until 12 October 2015:

The following is a table of full 13-a-side test matches.

See also

 Chile national rugby league team
 Rugby league in the Americas

References

External links
 Official Website of the Latin Heat

National rugby league teams
National sports teams of El Salvador
Rugby league in North America